Agostino Apollonio was an Italian painter of the Renaissance. He was born in Sant'Angelo in Vado, and painted around mid-1530s. He assisted his uncle Luzio Dolci. He lived in Castel Durante.

References

16th-century Italian painters
Italian male painters
Renaissance painters
People from the Province of Pesaro and Urbino
Year of death missing